Sudhamoy Ghosh MBE, FNA, FRSE, FCS, FRIC (13 January 1890 – 15 August 1970) was an Indian biochemist, natural products chemist and pharmacologist.

Life and career
Ghosh was born in Dhaka district, then in the eastern region of the Bengal Presidency and now in Bangladesh. He was the son of Rasik Lal Ghosh, a civil servant, and his wife Kusum Kumari. After matriculating from high school and completing his intermediate degree in science from the Comilla Victoria Government College, he completed his bachelor's (1910) and master's (1912) degrees in chemistry from Dhaka College, then an affiliated college of the University of Calcutta. The same year he completed his MSc., Ghosh married Nirmala Guha (d. 1945), with whom he had two daughters, Indira and Manju.

In 1913, he received a scholarship to the University of Edinburgh to pursue doctoral studies; at Edinburgh, he conducted research under the guidance of James Walker on the optical rotation of certain sugars. After receiving his doctorate in 1915, he became a research chemist at the Calcutta Medical College under Leonard Rogers, a prominent researcher in tropical medicine. In December 1921, he joined the faculty of the newly established Calcutta School of Tropical Medicine as Professor and Head of Chemistry, holding the position until his retirement.

Over the course of his career, Ghosh investigated numerous Indian medicinal plants for their chemical properties. Among those were Boerhaavia diffusa, from which he isolated the alkaloid punarnavine, and Sida cordifolia, from which he and A. T. Dutta isolated ephedrine. He and his students also isolated several new alkaloids during their research, including kurchine and kurchicine from the bark of Holarrhena antidysentrica, saussurine from Saussurea lappa and tylophorine from Tylophora asthmatica.

Ghosh was twice selected (in 1929 and in 1942) as a nominator for the Nobel Prize in Physiology or Medicine; on both occasions, he unsuccessfully nominated Sir Upendranath Brahmachari for the prize.

Following his retirement in 1947, Ghosh was appointed to the West Bengal Public Service Commission, serving as a member until November 1950. He retired to Calcutta, where he died of a cerebral haemorrhage at his residence on Independence Day 1970, aged 80.

Awards and honours
Fellow of the Chemical Society (FCS; 1915)
Fellow of the Royal Society of Edinburgh (FRSE; 1920)
Fellow of the Deutsche Pharmazeutische Gesellschaft (1926)
Minto Medal of the Calcutta School of Tropical Medicine (1931)
Fellow of the Royal Institute of Chemistry (FRIC; 1936)
Fellow of the Indian National Science Academy (FNA; 1945)
Member of the Order of the British Empire (MBE; 1945 Birthday Honours)

References

Notes

Indian pharmacologists
20th-century Indian chemists
Indian biochemists
Fellows of the Indian National Science Academy
Fellows of the Royal Society of Edinburgh
Fellows of the Royal Institute of Chemistry
Members of the Order of the British Empire
1890 births
1970 deaths
Scientists from Kolkata